Agapema galbina, the greasewood moth, is a moth in the family Saturniidae. It was described in 1860.

References 

Saturniidae
Moths described in 1860